Çartəpə (also, Chartapa and Chartepe) is a village and municipality in the Quba Rayon of Azerbaijan. It has a population of 706.

References 

Populated places in Quba District (Azerbaijan)